Moortown is an electoral ward of Leeds City Council in north Leeds, West Yorkshire, covering the suburb of the same name, Meanwood and the southern part of Moor Allerton below the Leeds Outer Ring Road.

Councillors since 1973 

 indicates seat up for re-election.
 indicates seat up for election following resignation or death of sitting councillor.
* indicates incumbent councillor.

Elections since 2010

2022

May 2021

May 2019

May 2018

May 2016

May 2015

May 2014

May 2012

May 2011

May 2010

See also
Listed buildings in Leeds (Moortown Ward)

Notes

References

Places in Leeds
Wards of Leeds